Pseudoalteromonas flavipulchra is a rod-shaped gram-negative marine bacterium.

References

External links
 
Type strain of Pseudoalteromonas flavipulchra at BacDive -  the Bacterial Diversity Metadatabase
Purification and Characterization https://www.microbiologyresearch.org/content/journal/micro/10.1099/mic.0.055970-0

Alteromonadales